Daniel Denis Boyle (born July 12, 1976) is a Canadian former professional ice hockey defenceman who played in the National Hockey League (NHL). Undrafted, Boyle played in the NHL for the Florida Panthers, the Tampa Bay Lightning, with whom he won the Stanley Cup in 2004, the San Jose Sharks and the New York Rangers.

Collegiate career
Boyle played junior hockey for the Gloucester Rangers of the Canadian Junior Hockey League and signed to play US college hockey for Miami University of the CCHA.  Boyle established himself quickly, making the first-team All-Rookie team in 1994-95, the All-CCHA First Team in 1996-97 and 1997-98, and being named a first-team All-American in both 1997 and 1998.   He was Miami's record holder for goals in a game by a defenseman (3) and points in a season by a defenseman (54). During his career, he ranked second at Miami in career assists (107), ninth in career points (147) and third in assists in a season (43 in 1997). In 1996-97, Boyle helped Miami to a 27-12-1 (.688) mark and the program's second ever appearance in the NCAA Tournament.  Boyle was named to the Miami University Athletic Hall of Fame in 2007.

Professional career

Florida Panthers
Undrafted in any NHL Entry Draft after four years of college hockey at Miami University, the under-sized defender was signed as a free agent by the Florida Panthers on March 30, 1998. He played his first two seasons in the Panthers' farm system in the American Hockey League (AHL), earning All-Rookie Team honours in 1999, as well as Second Team All-Star honours in 1999 and 2000. Boyle earned a full-time roster spot with the Panthers in 2000–01, recording four goals and 22 points.

Tampa Bay Lightning
The next season, his fourth in Florida, Boyle was traded to the Tampa Bay Lightning in exchange for a 2003 fifth-round draft pick (Martin Tůma) on January 7, 2002.  After completing the season with 20 points in 41 games after coming over from the Panthers, he was re-signed to a one-year contract by the Lightning on August 6, 2002.

Boyle recorded 13 goals and 53 points in his first full season with the Lightning in 2002–03 before helping the team to the 2004 Stanley Cup championship. Due to the 2004–05 NHL lockout, Boyle went overseas to play for Djurgårdens IF of the Swedish Elitserien. As NHL play resumed the next season, Boyle continued to produce with a 15-goal, 53-point season in 2005–06. He recorded his first career NHL hat-trick against the New York Rangers on December 23, 2006, adding an assist for a four-point game in a 4–3 win. The following season, Boyle elevated his game to career-high numbers of 20 goals, 43 assists and 63 points, good enough for Second team All-Star honours.

Boyle suffered a major setback, however, in September 2007, injuring himself in a freak accident after a pre-season game when a skate slipped off a hook in his locker and hit him in the left wrist, severing three tendons. Boyle underwent initial wrist surgery on September 23; he attempted to return on October 29, but after playing his first four games of the 2007–08 season, Boyle underwent additional surgery on the injured wrist, missing another 36 games. He did not make a full comeback until January 24, 2008, scoring two goals in his return, and soon thereafter was re-signed to a six-year, $40 million contract extension on February 25. He completed his injury-shortened campaign with 25 points in 37 games.

San Jose Sharks
Despite coming off a recent contract extension with the Lightning, on July 4, 2008, Boyle was traded, along with Brad Lukowich, to the San Jose Sharks in exchange for Matt Carle, Ty Wishart, a first-round draft pick in 2009 and a fourth-round draft pick in 2010. Boyle was pressured to waive his no-trade clause by Tampa Bay's new ownership, who said they would otherwise place him on waivers, where he would likely be claimed by the Atlanta Thrashers. Already knowing Joe Thornton, Patrick Marleau and Evgeni Nabokov, Boyle agreed to be traded to the Sharks.

In his first season with the Sharks, Boyle tallied 16 goals and 57 points over 77 games, leading all team defencemen. The following season, on December 31, 2009, Boyle scored his 100th career NHL goal against the Phoenix Coyotes in a 3–2 shootout win. He finished the campaign with 15 goals and 58 points. In the opening series of the 2010 playoffs, Boyle ended game three against the Colorado Avalanche in overtime by inadvertently shooting the puck into his own net. Pressured by Avalanche forward Ryan O'Reilly, Boyle attempted to ring the puck around the boards behind his net, but it was deflected by O'Reilly into the Sharks' net between Evgeni Nabokov's pad and the post. Nonetheless, the Sharks won the series 4–2, winning Games 4, 5 and 6; Boyle had a point in all three games.

In the first period of the October 15, 2013, against the St. Louis Blues, Boyle was checked from behind by Maxim Lapierre into the boards, injuring his jaw and knocking him unconscious; the incident led to a fight involving teammate Matt Pelech and 17 minutes worth of penalties for Andrew Desjardins. Boyle was taken off the ice via stretcher to a local hospital, and would miss the following game against the Dallas Stars. He returned on November 2, in a game against the Phoenix Coyotes, scoring a goal in a shootout loss. After the conclusion of the 2013–14 season, Sharks general manager Doug Wilson announced that pending free agent Boyle would not be returning to San Jose for the 2014–15 season. On June 5, the Sharks traded his rights to the New York Islanders for a conditional 2015 fifth-round pick.

New York Rangers
Unable to come to terms with the Islanders, Boyle opted to head to free agency, and on July 1, 2014, he signed a two-year contract with the New York Rangers.

On October 5, 2016, Boyle announced his retirement from the NHL. Boyle scored 164 goals and 605 points over 1,093 NHL games with four teams. In his retirement statement Boyle said, "I've been fortunate and blessed to have had the opportunity to do what I most love to do. All I wanted to do as a young boy was have the opportunity to play ONE game in the NHL. Over a thousand games later, this whole experience seems surreal. I want to thank all four organizations for the opportunity, my teammates and the FANS for this amazing run that I will cherish forever." Boyle stated that he will live in the San Jose area with his family.

International play
 

Boyle made his international debut with Canada at the 2005 World Championships in Austria during the 2004–05 NHL lockout. He contributed three assists in nine games as part of a silver medal-winning effort by Canada; they were defeated 3–0 in the gold medal game by the Czech Republic. The next year, Boyle was named as a reserve in light of injuries to Scott Niedermayer and Ed Jovanovski for Team Canada at the 2006 Winter Olympics in Turin. He did not appear in a game, however, as Team Canada was kept off the podium.

On December 30, 2009, team Canada general manager Steve Yzerman named Boyle to the 2010 Winter Olympic team as a full member. On February 28, 2010, the team defeated the United States to win Canada's eighth gold medal in Olympic men's hockey.

Personal life
Boyle and his now ex wife Amber have two daughters together. The family resides in Los Gatos, California. Boyle now lives with media personality and hockey reporter Tara Slone.

Growing up, Boyle attended French-speaking École élémentaire Sainte-Anne and École secondaire publique De La Salle in Ottawa.

During Game 1 of the 2004 Stanley Cup Finals with the Tampa Bay Lightning against the Calgary Flames, an electrical fire broke out in his Florida home, causing an estimated $300,000 worth of damage.

Career statistics

Regular season and playoffs

International

Awards and honours

See also
List of NHL players with 1,000 games played

References

External links
 

1976 births
Living people
Canadian ice hockey defencemen
Djurgårdens IF Hockey players
Florida Panthers players
Ice hockey people from Ottawa
Ice hockey players at the 2010 Winter Olympics
Louisville Panthers players
Medalists at the 2010 Winter Olympics
Miami RedHawks men's ice hockey players
National Hockey League All-Stars
New York Rangers players
Olympic gold medalists for Canada
Olympic ice hockey players of Canada
Olympic medalists in ice hockey
San Jose Sharks players
Stanley Cup champions
Tampa Bay Lightning players
Undrafted National Hockey League players
Canadian expatriate ice hockey players in Sweden
AHCA Division I men's ice hockey All-Americans